Argemma bonga is a butterfly in the family Hesperiidae. It is found in Tanzania (Usambara and Uluguru mountains). The habitat consists of forests.

References

Endemic fauna of Tanzania
Butterflies described in 1947
Hesperiinae